Genser is a surname. Notable people with the surname include:

Jared Genser, American human rights lawyer
Ken Genser (1950–2010), American politician